The National Club Baseball Association (NCBA) is the national body that governs club baseball at colleges and universities in the United States. Club teams are different from varsity teams in that the school doesn't completely sponsor the teams' expenses and the teams are not eligible to play in the NCAA's College World Series.

The NCBA was founded in 2000 to provide a national structure for the existing club teams. It structures the conferences, runs the NCBA College World Series (its national championship series), gathers playing statistics, assists teams in fundraising, and arranges for discounts on baseball clothing and equipment.

The NCBA is a division of CollClubSports which operates as a for-profit LLC with a sole proprietorship in the name of Greg "Sandy" Sanderson as President. Many club-sport governing bodies operate as non-profit groups in order to return the most benefit to member teams. League dues for the NCBA are $1,700 per season per team.

The two types of institutions that field club teams are schools that can't sponsor NCAA varsity baseball (often due to Title IX restrictions) and schools that do have a varsity team, but also have enough demand to field a second team.

Teams
The NCBA currently is divided into two divisions named Division I and II respectively. Division I is split up into eight regions with three conferences each. Division II is split up into eight districts with three conferences, each except Districts VI and VII which only have two conferences each.

There are currently nine schools that field both Division I and II teams:
Penn State
Maryland
Illinois
Wisconsin
Arizona State
Ohio State
Florida
Lone Star College
Texas A&M University

Division I

Great Lakes Region

North Conference

South Conference

West Conference

Gulf Coast Region

South Conference

North Conference

East Conference

Mid-America Region

North Conference

South Conference

West Conference

Mid-Atlantic Region

North Conference

South Conference

West Conference

North Atlantic Region

East Conference

North Conference

West Conference

Northern Pacific Region

North Conference

South Conference

West Conference

South Atlantic Region

East Conference

South Conference

West Conference

Southern Pacific Region

North Conference

South Conference

West Conference

Division II

Chesapeake

Central

South Conference

West Conference

District II

East Conference

South Conference

West Conference

District III

East Conference

North Conference

West Conference

District IV

East Conference

North Conference

West Conference

District V

North Conference

South Conference

West Conference

East Conference

District VI

North Conference

South Conference

District VII

East Conference

West Conference

District VIII

North Conference

South Conference

West Conference

Schools Joining the NCBA in 2014-15
All schools will be in Division II unless noted

NCBA World Series Champions

Division I champions

Division I appearances

Note: through the 2019 season.

Division II champions

† denotes school also fielded an NCBA Division I team that season

See also

References

External links

 
College baseball in the United States
College club sports associations in the United States
Baseball governing bodies in the United States
Sports organizations established in 2000